George Cunningham (born February 15, 1945) is an American Democrat politician who served in the Arizona House of Representatives from the 13th district from 1993 to 1997 and in the Arizona Senate from the 13th district from 1997 to 2001. Cunningham is a Fellow of the National Academy of Public Administration.

References

1945 births
Living people
Democratic Party members of the Arizona House of Representatives
Democratic Party Arizona state senators